Michela Cescon (born 13 April 1971) is an Italian actress.  Her film credits include Piazza Fontana: The Italian Conspiracy, Salty Air, Viva la libertà, Quando sei nato non puoi più nasconderti, First Love and Tulpa.

Selected filmography

References

External links
 

Living people
Italian film actresses
Italian television actresses
21st-century Italian actresses
Nastro d'Argento winners
1971 births
People from Treviso
David di Donatello winners